"What a Pushkin, what a son of a bitch!" (sometimes separated by exclamation mark instead of comma) is a catchphrase and winged word from Alexander Pushkin's correspondence with one of his friends, poet Pyotr Vyazemsky. The phrase commonly expresses a joy after finishing one's work and appears particularly in several Russian literary works.

In a letter dated circa November 7 or beginning of October 1825 Pushkin, celebrating his finished drama Boris Godunov wrote to Vyazemsky: 

That was preceded by what Pushkin wrote to Vyazemsky on July 13 of the same year:

See also
Pushkin studies

Notes

External links
JSTOR: The Letters of Alexander Pushkin

Quotations from literature
Russian words and phrases
1820s neologisms
Alexander Pushkin
Cultural depictions of Alexander Pushkin
1825 works
Catchphrases